The Oscar Getz Museum of Whiskey History is a museum in Bardstown, Kentucky, that chronicles the history of American whiskey from Colonial days through the 1960s. Abraham Lincoln's liquor license, advertising posters, prescriptions for the medicinal use of alcohol during National Prohibition, whiskey bottles, and other artifacts, including several moonshine stills, are on display.

The museum is part of the American Whiskey Trail.

See also
List of attractions and events in the Louisville metropolitan area

External links
Museum website

Buildings and structures in Bardstown, Kentucky

Museums in Nelson County, Kentucky
Industry museums in Kentucky
Drinks museums in the United States
Whisky